The "Afghan National Anthem" was the de jure national anthem of the internationally recognized Islamic Republic of Afghanistan used since 2006 but fell into disuse in 2021. The lyrics were written by Abdul Bari Jahani, and the music was composed by German-Afghan composer . It was de facto replaced by "This Is the Home of the Brave" after the Taliban takeover in 2021.

History
After the end of Taliban rule in 2001, a new national anthem was created for the "New Afghanistan", which, according to the 20th article of the new Afghan constitution, was to contain the names of the various ethnic groups of Afghanistan, and the formula "Allāhu Akbar" ("God is the greatest") had to be included. After a competition, "Millī Surūd" was declared the official national anthem in May 2006.

After the Taliban takeover on 15 August 2021, it was replaced by "This Is the Home of the Brave". However, in the 2021 ICC Men's T20 World Cup in October–November, it was still played as the national anthem of Afghanistan, along with the flag of the internationally recognized Islamic Republic of Afghanistan. The Islamic Republic anthem and flag were also used in the 2022 CAFA U-19 Futsal Championship.

Criticism
The national anthem has been criticized several times: The Pashto language would marginalize other ethnicities, and the text still does not name all ethnic groups of the country. According to devout Muslims, the formula "Allāhu Akbar" should not appear in a song.

Lyrics

See also

List of historical national anthems
Music of Afghanistan

Notes

References

External links

Afghan songs
National symbols of Afghanistan
National Anthem of Afghanistan
Asian anthems
National anthem compositions in E-flat minor
Pashto-language songs